The women's balance beam competition at the 1952 Summer Olympics was held at Messuhalli, Exhibition Hall II from 22 to 23 July, 1952. It was the first appearance of the event, though balance beam exercise were part of the women's team all-around events in 1936 and 1948.

Competition format
The gymnastics format continued to use the aggregation format. Each nation entered a team of eight gymnasts or up to three individual gymnasts. All entrants in the gymnastics competitions performed both a compulsory exercise and a voluntary exercise for each apparatus. The four apparatus that became standard (floor, balance beam, uneven bars, and vault) were all used in the same Games for the first time. 

No separate finals were contested.

For each individual exercise, five judges gave scores from 0 to 10 in one-tenth point increments. The top and bottom scores were discarded and the remaining three scores averaged to give the exercise total. Thus, exercise scores ranged from 0 to 10 and apparatus scores from 0 to 20. 

The competitor had the option to make a second try only on the compulsory exercise—with the second attempt counting regardless of whether it was better than the first. For voluntary exercises, only one attempt could be made.

Results

References

Women's balance beam
1952
Women's events at the 1952 Summer Olympics